Ushigasako-ike Dam is an earthfill dam located in Yamaguchi prefecture in Japan. The dam is used for irrigation. The catchment area of the dam is 0.8 km2. The dam impounds about 2  ha of land when full and can store 192 thousand cubic meters of water. The construction of the dam was completed in 1914.

References

Dams in Yamaguchi Prefecture
1914 establishments in Japan